José Ramón Medina Elorga (San Francisco de Macaira, Guárico, 20 July 1919  - Caracas, 14 June 2010), was a Venezuelan lawyer, writer, poet and politician.

Poetry work 
 Edad de la esperanza (1947)
 Rumor sobre diciembre (1949)
 Vísperas de la aldea (1949)
 Elegía (1950)
 A la sombra de los días (1950)
 Parva luz de la estancia familiar (1952)
 Texto sobre el tiempo (1952)
 Los días sedientos y diez elegías (1953)
 La voz profunda (1954)
 Como la vida (1954–1958)
 Antología poética (1957)
 Viento en la tarde (1959)
 Memorias y elegías (1960)
 Poesías (1961)
 Poesía plural (1969)
 Sobre la tierra yerma (1971)
 Ser verdadero (1982)
 Certezas y presagios (1984)

See also 
Celarg
Venezuelan literature
List of Venezuelan writers

References 
  José Ramón Medina biography - Efemérides venezolanas
  Falleció el poeta José Ramón Medina - El Nacional
  Falleció el escritor y poeta José Ramón Medina - El Universal
  José Ramón Medina - Ministerio Público

1921 births
2010 deaths
20th-century Venezuelan judges
Venezuelan male poets
Members of the Senate of Venezuela
20th-century Venezuelan poets
20th-century male writers